Gazbar may refer to:
 Gazbar, Rudbar-e Jonubi (گازبر - Gāzbar)